John Neale may refer to:

Sir J. E. Neale (John Ernest Neale, 1890–1975), British historian
John Neale (academic) (fl. 1556–1570), Oxford college head
John Neale (bishop) (1926–2020), inaugural Bishop of Ramsbury, 1974–1988
John Neale (MP) (1687–1746), MP for Coventry and Wycombe
John Henry Neale II (1896–1961), American shipping executive
John Mason Neale (1818–1866), English divine, scholar and hymn-writer
John Preston Neale (1780–1847), English architectural draughtsman
John Neal (writer) (1793–1876), American writer, critic, editor, lecturer, and activist whose last name was misspelled "Neale" in some publications

See also
John Neal (disambiguation)
John Neill (disambiguation)